Tutleky is a municipality and village in Rychnov nad Kněžnou District in the Hradec Králové Region of the Czech Republic. It has about 400 inhabitants.

Administrative parts
The village of Dubí is an administrative part of Tutleky.

References

Villages in Rychnov nad Kněžnou District